The spring pancake is a traditional Chinese food  unique to the northern regions. The pancake is prepared by rubbing oil between two thin layers of leavened dough; after steaming, the pancake can be peeled apart to add fillings. People eat spring pancakes on the day called lichun to celebrate the beginning of the spring.

The spring pancake took its rise from the Jin dynasty and has prospered since the Tang dynasty. The lichun was valued by both Chinese ancient kings and civilians. Unlike kings’ great celebrations, civilians celebrated the lichun by eating spring pancakes wrapped around fresh vegetables and meat, which is called bite-the-spring. Bite-the-spring implies that civilians are praying for a good harvest year by eating fresh vegetables and meat at the beginning of spring. In the Qing dynasty, spring pancakes became a fried pancake wrapped around a filling that included ham, chicken, pork, black dates, scallions, walnuts and sugar. In addition, spring pancakes were one of the nine desserts for the regal banquet of the Qing dynasty. The spring pancake is slightly larger than the pancake that is served with Peking duck. The wrapped, filled pancakes were in later times fried and served as what are called spring rolls.

Miscellaneous
The pork used to cook spring pancakes is usually bought from a store in Beijing named Tianfuhao, which has been in business for over 270 years.

Notes

Sources
“Chinese celebrate 'beginning of spring'” Ningbo View 5 Feb. 2009. 20 Feb. 2009 http://english.cnnb.com.cn/system/2009/02/05/005978790.shtml 
“Spring Pancakes (Chun Bing)” Doule 14 Oct. 2005. 20 Feb. 2009 http://www.doule.net/commonality/ywb/LiLZ/Bas/200510/20922.html 
“The breath of the spring is coming on. One of Chinese traditional food is spring pancake” Teach you How to Cook Chinese Food 20 Feb. 2009 https://archive.today/20090206122252/http://www.achinesefood.com/2009/02/03/the-breath-of-the-spring-is-coming-on-one-of-chinese-traditional-food-is-spring-pancake.html

Beijing cuisine
Chinese pancakes
Chinese New Year foods